The Forgan Bridge is a road bridge over the Pioneer River in Mackay, Queensland, Australia.

The construction of the duplication and replacement of the old Forgan Bridge commenced in May 2008 and was completed in August 2011.

History

The original Forgan Bridge was opened on 30 March 1938 by Mrs Forgan Smith, wife of the Queensland Premier William Forgan Smith, as a replacement for the earlier Sydney Street Bridge.
The bridge was named in memory of Mary Forgan, the mother of former Queensland premier William Forgan Smith.

The A$148 million Forgan Bridge Replacement and Duplication Project included replacement of two bridges; the Forgan Bridge and the Barnes Creek Bridge, and widening of Barnes Creek Road. The existing two-lane bridges and road were replaced with new four-lane bridges and road. The project was delivered in two stages; stage 1 included construction of new two-lane bridges and stage 2 included demolition of the existing bridges and construction of new two-lane bridges in their place.

The new bridge was opened on 14 August 2011 by Main Roads Minister Craig Wallace, local member of parliament Tim Mulherin, and Mackay mayor Col Meng.

References

External links
  Forgan Bridge Replacement and Duplication Project website

Road bridges in Queensland
Buildings and structures in Mackay, Queensland
Bridges completed in 1936
Bridges completed in 2011
Concrete bridges in Australia
1936 establishments in Australia
Mackay, Queensland
Truss bridges in Australia